Mitchell Allgood (born 27 April 1989) is an Australian professional rugby league footballer who last played as a  for the London Broncos in the Betfred Championship.

He previously played for the Parramatta Eels and the St George Illawarra Dragons in the NRL, and Hull KR and Wakefield Trinity in the Super League. He has also played for NSW City in 2012.

Background
Allgood was born in Sydney, New South Wales, Australia.

Rugby league career

Early playing career
Allgood played his junior football with Brothers, Penrith Junior Rugby League Club. He played in the SG Ball competition with the Penrith Panthers, before signing with Parramatta to play in the Toyota Cup. In 2008, Allgood signed a two year deal with Parramatta after great form in the Toyota Cup.

2011-2014: Parramatta Eels
Allgood made his NRL début in round 1 2011 against the New Zealand Warriors. He only missed 1 game in his rookie year. He was also named the 2011 Parramatta Eels season's rookie of the year.
.In 2011, Allgood re-signed with Parramatta until 2013.  In 2013, Allgood was sin binned after punching Manly player Steve Matai and later suspended for two games.  Allgood claims he was challenged by Matai on the field and said it was a case of "hit or be hit". 

In September 2013, Allgood was pulled over by police and charged with drink driving.  It was alleged Allgood had been drinking with other Parramatta players as part of the club's Mad Monday celebrations.  On December 18, 2013, Allgood was handed a two year good behaviour bond by the magistrate. 

On 2 June 2014 Allgood was suspended for two games after being found guilty of a dangerous throw on Penrith player Josh Mansour.

2015-2016  Hull Kingston Rovers 
On 22 November 2014, Allgood signed a three-year contract with Hull Kingston Rovers, starting from 2015.

2017-  Wakefield Trinity 
On 4 December 2016, Allgood signed for Wakefield Trinity on a 1 year deal following the relegation of Hull Kingston Rovers. Allgood was given the jersey number 10 by Chris Chester & John Kear

2018-2019 St George Illawarra Dragons
On 6 November 2017, Allgood signed for the St George Illawarra Dragons on a one-year deal. At the end of the season he re- signed with the Dragons until the end of 2019.

Allgood made his debut for St George in round 16 of the 2019 NRL season against the Melbourne Storm at WIN Stadium.  In November 2019, it was announced that Allgood had been released by the club.

London Broncos
On 31 January 2020, Allgood signed a contract to join the London Broncos for the 2020 season.

Representative career
Allgood was named in the 2012 New South Wales City team to replace Keith Galloway on the bench.

Controversy
In September 2013, Allgood was pulled over by police and charged with a drink driving offence.  It was alleged Allgood had been drinking with other Parramatta players as part of the club's Mad Monday celebrations.  On 18 December 2013 Allgood was handed a two-year good behaviour bond by the magistrate.

References

External links
St. George Illawarra Dragons profile
Wakefield Trinity profile
NRL profile

1989 births
Living people
Australian rugby league players
Australian expatriate sportspeople in England
Hull Kingston Rovers players
New South Wales City Origin rugby league team players
Parramatta Eels players
Rugby league players from Sydney
Rugby league props
Wakefield Trinity players
Wentworthville Magpies players
St. George Illawarra Dragons players